The 2005 Super 12 season was the tenth season of the Super 12, contested by teams from Australia, New Zealand and South Africa. The season ran from February to May 2005, with each team playing all the others once. At the end of the regular season, the top four teams entered the playoff semi finals, with the first placed team playing the fourth and the second placed team playing the third. The winner of each semi final qualified for the final, which was contested by the Crusaders and New South Wales Waratahs at Lancaster Park, Christchurch. The Crusaders won 35–25 to win their fifth Super 12 title.

This was the final season of Super 12 before the expansion to Super 14 with the Western Force and Cheetahs.

Table

Results

Round 1

Round 2

Round 3

Round 4

Round 5

Round 6

Round 7

Round 8

Round 9

Round 10

Round 11

Round 12

Finals

Semi-finals

Grand final

Player statistics

Leading try-scorers

Leading point-scorers

Notes and references

Further reading

Super Rugby seasons
1
1
1
Super 12